Dr Wilhelm Ferdinand Erichson (26 November 1809 in Stralsund – 18 December 1848 in Berlin) was a trained medical doctor and a German entomologist.

He was the author of many articles about insects mainly in Archiv für Naturgeschichte. When writing in Latin, he latinised Wilhelm to Guillelmus becoming either Guil. F. Erichson or G.F. Erichson. He wrote a paper in 1842 on insect species collected at Woolnorth in Tasmania, Australia, which was the first detailed research published on the biogeography of Australian animals and was very influential in raising scientific interest in Australian fauna. 

Erichson was the curator of the Coleoptera collections at the Museum fur Naturkunde in Berlin from 1834 to 1848. Erichson's Scarabaeidae classification is nearly identical to the modern one.

Works

Genera Dytiscorum. Berlin (1832) 
Die Käfer der Mark Brandenburg. Two volumes Berlin (1837-1839) Click for pdf:
Genera et species Staphylinorum insectorum. Berlin 1839-1840) 
Entomographien. Berlin (1840) 
 1839: IX. Insecten. Archiv für Naturgeschichte 5(2): 281–375. PDF
 1842: Beitrag zur Insecten-Fauna von Vandiemensland, mit besonderer Berücksichtigung der geographischen Verbreitung der Insecten. Archiv für Naturgeschichte 8: 83-287. PDF
Bericht über die wissenschaftlichen Leistungen auf dem Gebiete der Entomologie. Berlin (1838) 
Naturgeschichte der Insecten Deutschlands. Berlin (1845-1848)

References

1809 births
1848 deaths
People from Stralsund
German entomologists
People from the Province of Pomerania